Kevan Hamilton (1 February 1934 – 30 July 2017 ) was an Australian rules footballer who played for the Carlton Football Club in the Victorian Football League (VFL).

Hamilton made his debut for Carlton in round 6 of the 1956 season and spent 1957 playing in the Reserves.

Hamilton returned to McKinnon Football Club in 1958 and proceeded to win the Federal Football League's best and fairest award, the J. W. Allnut Medal in 1958, 1961, 1962, 1963 and 1964.

External links
 Kevan Hamilton at Blueseum

References

Carlton Football Club players
Australian rules footballers from Victoria (Australia)
1934 births
2017 deaths